Sir Edward Young  (born 24 October 1966) is the Private Secretary to King Charles III. As Private Secretary to the Sovereign, he is the senior operational member of the Royal Households of the United Kingdom. Young was recruited to the Royal Household in 2004, serving as the Queen's Assistant and then Deputy Private Secretary until his promotion to Private Secretary in 2017. He is the 24th holder of the office of Private Secretary since its inception in 1805.

Early life and education
Edward Young was born on 24 October 1966 to Dr Edward Young and Sally Rougier Young. He was educated as a boarder at Reading School in Berkshire.

Early career 
Young worked for the international side of Barclays Bank between 1985 and 1997, where he held a range of executive roles including as a specialist in international trade finance and as manager for the Corporate Bank European Currency Programme. In 1997, he moved to Barclays' Head Office to become the bank's Deputy Head of Corporate Public Relations.

From late 1999 to 2001, he was advisor to the Conservative Shadow Chancellor of the Exchequer, Michael Portillo, and then to the party's Leader of the Opposition, William Hague. In 2001, Young was appointed Head of Communications at Granada plc, working primarily on the merger with Carlton Communications to form ITV PLC in 2004.

Royal Household

Assistant and Deputy Private Secretary, 2004–2017
Young began as the Assistant Private Secretary to the Queen in September 2004. He was promoted to Deputy Private Secretary in September 2007 after the promotion of Christopher Geidt from Deputy Private Secretary to Private Secretary, on the retirement of Sir Robin Janvrin, Private Secretary from 1997 to 2007.

As Deputy Private Secretary he played a key role in the planning of the Queen's visit to the Republic of Ireland in 2011. He is credited with assisting the Queen in writing the highly praised speech, which she began with a few words in the Irish language. The Queen's visit was hailed as a diplomatic triumph that improved Anglo-Irish relations. Young led the national planning of the Queen's Diamond Jubilee, which took place the following year.

Private Secretary, 2017–present
Young became Private Secretary in 2017, on Geidt's retirement. As Private Secretary, Young is also Keeper of the Royal Archives and a Trustee of the Royal Collection Trust.

As head of the Private Secretary's Office, Young has direct control over the Press Office, the office of the Director for Security Liaison, the research, correspondence, anniversaries and records offices, and the Royal Archives.

As Private Secretary, Young is a member of the so-called 'golden triangle' of senior British officials – the others being the Cabinet Secretary and the Principal Private Secretary to the Prime Minister – with key responsibilities in the event of a hung parliament in the United Kingdom.

On 11 March 2021, The Times reported that royal historian Robert Lacey stated that Young had a share of the responsibility for the so-called Megxit royal crisis after the Oprah with Meghan and Harry U.S. CBS television interview. Lacey charged that Young had lacked the imagination to find a fulfilling role for Meghan, Duchess of Sussex after her marriage to Prince Harry in 2018.

Personal life 
In 2003, Young married Nichola O'Brien Malone. The couple have a daughter.

Honours and awards
Young was appointed Lieutenant of the Royal Victorian Order (LVO) in the 2010 Birthday Honours, Commander of the Royal Victorian Order (CVO) in the 2015 Birthday Honours, and Knight Commander of the Royal Victorian Order (KCVO) in the 2020 New Year Honours.

On 11 October 2017, Young was sworn of the Privy Council.

References

1966 births
Living people
People educated at Reading School
Private Secretaries to the Sovereign
Deputy Private Secretaries to the Sovereign
Assistant Private Secretaries to the Sovereign
Knights Commander of the Royal Victorian Order
Members of the British Royal Household
Members of the Privy Council of the United Kingdom